Below is a list of those who have held the office of Governor of Berwick-upon-Tweed, including the garrison at Holy Island (during English occupation of the Royal Burgh):

Governors of Berwick-upon-Tweed

For Scotland
 1295 -1296 Sir William Douglas
 1328 - 1333  Sir Alexander de Seton, Lord of Seton & Winchburgh
 1333 Sir William Keith
 1333 Patrick de Dunbar

For England
1302: Edmund Hasting
1440-?: Henry Percy, 2nd Earl of Northumberland

For Scotland
1461 Sir Robert Lauder
1474: David Lindsay, Earl of Crawford
1478: Sir Robert Lauder (again)
1482: Patrick Hepburn, 1st Lord Hailes

For England
1484-?: Henry Percy, 3rd Earl of Northumberland
?–1539: Sir Thomas Clifford
1539–?: William Eure, 1st Baron Eure (died 1548)
1553–?: John Conyers, 3rd Baron Conyers (died 1557)
1559–1562: William Grey, 13th Baron Grey de Wilton
1564-1568: Francis Russell, 2nd Earl of Bedford
1568-1596: Henry Carey, 1st Baron Hunsdon
1596–1598: John Carey, 3rd Baron Hunsdon
1598-1601: Peregrine Bertie, 13th Baron Willoughby de Eresby
1601–1603: John Carey, 3rd Baron Hunsdon (2nd term)
c.1610: Sir James Dundas of Arniston
1639-?: Robert Bertie, 1st Earl of Lindsey
1649–: Colonel George Fenwick
1660-1675: William Widdrington, 2nd Baron Widdrington
1675-1686: Henry Cavendish, 2nd Duke of Newcastle-upon-Tyne
1686-1688: William Widdrington, 3rd Baron Widdrington
1689–1690: Philip Babington
1691–1699: Richard Leveson (died 1699)
1702–1707: Edmund Maine

For Great Britain (post 1707 Act of Union)
1707–1711: Edmund Maine
1713–1715: Sir Henry Belasyse
1715–1718: Charles Wills
1718–1719: George MacCartney
1719–1732: Joseph Sabine
1732–1733: George Wade
1733–1735: Rich Russell
1735–1740: Philip Honywood
1740–1741: Thomas Whetham
1742: James Tyrrell
1742–1753: Thomas Howard
1753–1765: John Guise
1765–1778: Robert Monckton
1778: Sir John Clavering (in fact Clavering had died in the East Indies the previous year)
1778–1780: Sir John Mordaunt
1780–1795: Hon. John Vaughan
1795–1808: Hon. William Howe, later Viscount Howe
1808–1833: Banastre Tarleton
1833–1850: Sir James Bathurst

Lieutenant-Governors

 1702–1705: Edward Nott
 1705: William Dobyns
 ?–1733: Rich Russell
 1733–1737: James St. Clair
 1737–1747: John Price
 1749–1764: John Barrington
 1765?-1767: Roderick Gwynne
 1767–1793: William Hill
 1793–1794: Gerard Lake
 1794–1795: Edmund Stevens
 1795–?1842: George Ludlow

References
The London Gazette

History of Berwick-upon-Tweed
Berwick
Lindisfarne
English history-related lists
Berwick